Claudine Chatel (born Claudine Cabay; 3 October 1951) is a Québécoise actress who had mainly worked on television soap operas before she specialized in voice dubbing. She is the daughter of actor and screenwriter .

Chatel published two books under the name Claudine Cabay Chatel.

Biography

Born in Verviers, Belgium, Claudine Chatel arrived in Québec with her family in 1953. She trained in drama and then began as an actress at CKVL in the radio drama Côte Vertu when she was seventeen. In 1970, she appeared for the first time on television in the soap opera  presented on TVA. She played the role of Ginette Berger during the eight seasons of the programme, and continued the role in the spin-off series .

Chatel began voice dubbing in 1987 as an actress and stage director, then devoted herself almost exclusively to this field after the death of her father in 1990. She has dubbed well-known actresses like Shirley MacLaine, Barbra Streisand, Sissy Spacek and Susan Sarandon. She has also taught dubbing at the Montreal Conservatory of Dramatic Art since 1995.

Chatel published a biography of her father, Des pas dans mon mémoire, in 2008, followed by a novel, L'éternité... c'est pour quand?, in 2014.

Personal life

Chatel has struggled with depression and anxiety.  Her daughter encouraged her to begin therapy, and Chatel started writing about her family's history in order to move past the traumas of her past.  This included the disappearance and murder of her niece, Melanie, a crime which has never been solved; the death of her parents; and two confusing and depressing years spent in the Church of Scientology.

Works

Filmography
1970 –  (television series): Ginette Berger
1978 –  (television series): Ginette Beaulieu
1981 – The Champions: narrator
1986 –  (English: The Gold of Time) (television series): Marie-Christine Vanier
1990 – Nathaël et la chasse au phoques (Nathaniel and the seal hunt): voices
2003 –  (The Children of Fire, TV series): Helgwart
2014 – Une nouvelle Amie (A New Friend) by François Ozon

Theatre
1980 – Poutoulik of Henri Deyglun at Théâtre des Marguerites

Books

References

1951 births
Living people
Belgian emigrants to Canada
French Quebecers
Writers from Quebec
Canadian television actresses
Canadian voice actresses
Actresses from Quebec
People from Verviers
21st-century Canadian actresses
21st-century Canadian novelists
Canadian women novelists
Canadian novelists in French
Canadian biographers
Canadian women non-fiction writers
21st-century Canadian women writers
Women biographers